Istimis is a rural locality (a selo) and the administrative center of Istimissky Selsoviet of Klyuchevsky District, Altai Krai, Russia. The population was 604 as of 2016. There are 7 streets.

Geography 
Istimis is located 17 km northeast of Klyuchi (the district's administrative centre) by road. Novopoltava is the nearest rural locality.

Ethnicity 
The village is inhabited by Ukrainians and others.

References 

Rural localities in Klyuchevsky District